Lukas Ronald Rumkabu (born July 13, 1977) is an Indonesian footballer that currently plays for Persidafon Dafonsoro in the Indonesia Super League.

Personal life
His young brother Zico Rumkabu is also professional footballer both play together in Persidafon Dafonsoro started from 2010-11 season.

References

External links

1977 births
Living people
Papuan people
Indonesian Christians
Association football forwards
Indonesian footballers
Liga 1 (Indonesia) players
Persidafon Dafonsoro players
Sportspeople from Papua